Scott Christopher Thwaites (born 12 February 1990) is a British cyclist, who currently rides for UCI ProTeam . He represented England in the 2014 Commonwealth Games road race and won the bronze medal.

Career
Thwaites was born in Burley in Wharfedale.

NetApp–Endura (2013–16)

He was named in the startlist for the 2016 Vuelta a España.

Team Dimension Data (2017–18)
In September 2016  confirmed that Thwaites would join them for 2017. In his first season with the team, he took a top 10 finish in Strade Bianche, and in June 2017, he was named in the startlist for the 2017 Tour de France, completing the race in 107th place. However, his 2018 season was disrupted by sustaining serious injuries in a training crash, and he left the team at the end of the year.

Vitus Pro Cycling (2019)
In 2019 he took top ten finishes in the European Games and the Tour de Yorkshire.

Alpecin–Fenix
In December 2019 it was reported that Thwaites would join , later renamed , on an initial one-year contract for 2020.

Major results

2005
 3rd Road race, National Junior Road Championships
2006
 2nd Road race, National Junior Road Championships
2007
 2nd Road race, National Junior Road Championships
 2nd National Junior CX Championships
2009
 1st  National Under-23 XC MTB Championships
2010
 6th Overall Tour of the Reservoir
2011
 1st  Road race, National Under-23 Road Championships
 1st Otley Criterium
 1st Lincoln Grand Prix
 1st Stoke-on-Trent, Tour Series
2012
 1st  National Criterium Championships
 1st Overall Premier Calendar
 1st  Overall Tour of the Reservoir
 Tour Series
1st Kirkcaldy
1st Oxford
 3rd Overall Tour Doon Hame
1st Stage 2
 5th Grand Prix de la Ville de Lillers
2013
 5th Handzame Classic
 7th Le Samyn
 8th Philadelphia International Championship
2014
 2nd Ronde van Drenthe
 3rd  Road race, Commonwealth Games
 6th Nokere Koerse
2015
 3rd Nokere Koerse
 5th Road race, National Road Championships
 5th Ronde van Drenthe
 5th Dwars door Drenthe
2016
 2nd Le Samyn
 5th Road race, National Road Championships
 7th Trofeo Pollenca-Port de Andratx
 8th Dwars door Vlaanderen
 10th Kuurne–Brussels–Kuurne
2017
 10th Strade Bianche
2019
 7th Road race, European Games
 8th Overall Tour de Yorkshire
 10th Rutland–Melton CiCLE Classic

Grand Tour general classification results timeline

References

External links

1990 births
Living people
British male cyclists
Cyclists at the 2014 Commonwealth Games
Commonwealth Games bronze medallists for England
People from Burley in Wharfedale
Commonwealth Games medallists in cycling
European Games competitors for Great Britain
Cyclists at the 2019 European Games
Sportspeople from West Yorkshire
Cyclists from Yorkshire
Medallists at the 2014 Commonwealth Games